The 1967 Cork Senior Hurling Championship was the 79th staging of the Cork Senior Hurling Championship since its establishment by the Cork County Board in 1887. The championship began on 16 April 1967 and ended on 8 October 1967.

Avondhu were the defending champions, however, they were defeated by University College Cork in the first round.

On 8 October 1967, Glen Rovers won the championship following a 3-09 to 1-09 defeat of St. Finbarr's in the final. This was their 21st championship title overall and their first in three championship seasons.

Pierce Freaney of the St. Finbarr's club was the championship's top scorer with 3-24.

Team changes

To Championship

Promoted from the Cork Intermediate Hurling Championship
 Cloyne

Results

First round

Quarter-finals

Semi-finals

Final

Championship statistics

Scoring

Top scorers overall

Top scorers in a single game

Miscellaneous

 On 15 June 1967, Christy Ring played his last championship game for Glen Rovers against University College Cork. He made his first championship appearance during the 1941 championship.

References

Cork Senior Hurling Championship
Cork Senior Hurling Championship